Diocese of Westminster may refer to:
 Roman Catholic Diocese of Westminster, since 1850, with seat at Westminster Cathedral
 Diocese of Westminster (Church of England), extant from 1540 to 1550, with seat at what is now Westminster Abbey